Gruffydd ap Rhys (c. 1090 – 1137) was Prince of Deheubarth, in Wales. His sister was the Princess Nest ferch Rhys.  He was the father of Rhys ap Gruffydd, known as 'The Lord Rhys', who was one of the most successful rulers of Deheubarth during this period.

Family 
Issue prior to marriage to Gwenllian:

 Anarawd (murdered in 1143). He had a son, Einion, who was murdered in his bed in 1163
 Cadell (died 1175)

Second he married Gwenllian ferch Gruffydd and by her he had issue:

 Morgan (born c. 1116)
 Maelgwyn (born c. 1119)
 Gwladus (born between 1120 and 1130)
 Nest (born between 1120 and 1130)
 Owain ap Gruffydd (born c. 1126) 
 Maredudd (born c. 1130/1, died 1155)
 Rhys (born c. 1132)
 Sion ap Gruffydd (born c. 1134)

Early life
Gruffydd was born in Llandeilo.  Following the death of his father Rhys ap Tewdwr in 1093, Deheubarth was taken over by the Normans, and Gruffydd spent much of his early years in exile in Ireland.

In 1113 or 1115 Gruffydd returned to South Wales. He was accused by King Henry I of England and so went to Gruffudd ap Cynan for help.  Gruffudd ap Cynan planned to murder Gruffydd to receive a reward from King Henry I, but Gruffydd's sister Nest warned him and he was able to escape to Llŷn.

In 1116 Gruffydd attacked Castle Llanmyddyfri, but was defeated. He also attacked Swansea Castle, and destroyed the outer walls; and captured or destroyed Carmarthen Castle, and either in this year or in 1114 captured Kidwelly Castle. However an attack on Aberystwyth was defeated and Gruffydd's army dispersed.

In 1121 or 1122 Gruffydd made peace with King Henry I and was allowed to rule a portion of his father's kingdom, the Cantref Mawr, although he was soon under pressure from the Normans again and was forced to flee to Ireland for a period in 1127.

Rebellion
In 1135 Gruffydd was summoned by King Stephen of England to London, but refused to go.

In 1136 he joined Owain Gwynedd and Cadwaladr, the sons of Gruffudd ap Cynan of Gwynedd, in a rebellion against Norman rule. While Gruffydd was away from home, his wife Gwenllian led her husband's troops against Maurice of London, but was defeated, captured, and beheaded. In this battle his son Morgan was also slain, and his son Maelgwn was captured. In revenge for his wife's execution Gruffydd attacked the English and the Fleming residents of South Wales, causing great destruction of property, crops, and livestock. Gruffydd himself with Owain and Cadwaladr gained a crushing victory over the Normans at Crug Mawr near Cardigan the same year. In celebration of driving the English and the Fleming from South Wales, Gruffydd hosted a grand festival that lasted for 40 days.

Death and succession
In 1136 or early 1137 Gruffydd died in uncertain circumstances. Florence of Worcester claimed that Gruffydd was murdered by his second wife.

He was succeeded by his son, Anarawd. Of his other sons, Cadell, Maredydd, and Rhys (later known as The Lord Rhys) all ruled Deheubarth in turn.

References

1090s births
Gruffydd ap Rhys, Prince of Deheubarth
Gruffydd
Monarchs of Deheubarth
12th-century Welsh monarchs
People from Llandeilo